John Charles Dunne (born October 30, 1937) is an American prelate of the Roman Catholic Church.  Dunn served as an auxiliary bishop of the Diocese of Rockville Centre in New York from 1988 until  2013.

Biography

Early life 
John Dunne was born on October 30, 1937, in Brooklyn, New York, to Mark and Helen Dunne. His only brother, Mark J. Dunne, was a priest of the Diocese of Rockville Centre.

Dunn attended the parochial school of St. Boniface Parish in Elmont, New York and then went to St. Francis Preparatory School in Brooklyn.  He went to Cathedral College in Brooklyn before entering the Seminary of the Immaculate Conception in Huntington, New York.

Priesthood 
Dunn was ordained to the priesthood for the Diocese of Rockville Centre by Bishop Walter Philip Kellenberg on June 1, 1963. Dunne served as a curate at St. Anthony of Padua Parish in East Northport, New York, and was later named associate director of the Confraternity of Christian Doctrine and of the Family Life Bureau. In 1970, he became spiritual director of the Seminary of the Immaculate Conception, where he remained until he was appointed associate vicar for religious. In 1974, Dunn was named a curate at Corpus Christi Parish in Mineola, New York,  and in 1978 director of the Priest Personnel Office.  In 1984, Dunn was appointed pastor of Blessed Sacrament Parish in Valley Stream, New York.

Auxiliary Bishop of Rockville Centre 
On October 21, 1988, Dunne was appointed as an auxiliary bishop of the Diocese of Rockville Centre and titular bishop of Abercornia by Pope John Paul II. He was  consecrated on December 13, 1988, by Bishop John McGann, with Bishops James Daly and Alfred Markiewicz serving as co-consecrators at St. Agnes Cathedral in Rockville Centre. Dunn selected as his episcopal motto: "God Is Love"  from 1 John 4:16.

As a member of the United States Conference of Catholic Bishops, Dunne served as chairman of the Bishops' Committee on Science and Human Values and of the Committee on Women in Society and in the Church.

On June 22, 2013, Pope Francis accepted Dunn's letter of resignation as auxiliary bishop of Rockville Centre.

See also
 

 Catholic Church hierarchy
 Catholic Church in the United States
 Historical list of the Catholic bishops of the United States
 List of Catholic bishops of the United States
 Lists of patriarchs, archbishops, and bishops

References

External links
The Roman Catholic Diocese of Rockville Centre Official Site

Episcopal succession
 

}

1937 births
Living people
People from Brooklyn
20th-century Roman Catholic bishops in the United States
People from East Northport, New York
Catholics from New York (state)
21st-century Roman Catholic bishops in the United States